Hugh Geoffrey Birch Wilson CBE (11 June 1903 – 11 April 1975) was a Conservative party politician in the United Kingdom.  Wilson served as Member of Parliament (MP) for Truro from its re-creation by boundary changes in 1950 until his retirement in 1970.

References

External links 

 

1903 births
1975 deaths
Commanders of the Order of the British Empire
Conservative Party (UK) MPs for English constituencies
Members of the Parliament of the United Kingdom for Truro
UK MPs 1950–1951
UK MPs 1951–1955
UK MPs 1955–1959
UK MPs 1959–1964
UK MPs 1964–1966
UK MPs 1966–1970